Andreas Frühwirth, (21 August 1845 – 9 February 1933) was an Austrian friar of the Dominican Order. He was promoted to the rank of cardinal of the Catholic Church and served as the Major Penitentiary of Apostolic Penitentiary.

Life
He was born Franz Frühwirth in the village of St. Anna am Aigen, located in the Province of Styria, Austria. His last name is also listed as Frühwirt.

Education
Frühwirth joined the Dominican Order on 13 September 1863 in Graz and received the religious name of Andreas. He was professed on 14 September 1864. He studied at the Dominican houses of studies where he studied philosophy and theology.  Later he studied at the College of St Thomas in Rome, the future Pontifical University of Saint Thomas Aquinas, Angelicum in Rome from 1869 to 1870.  He completed the exam for Lectorate at the College in 1870.

Priesthood
Frühwirth was ordained to the priesthood on 5 July 1868 in Graz. He then taught theology for six years in the Dominican College of Graz and was its prior from 1872 to 1875, and then prior of the house in Vienna from 1876 to 1880. He was elected Master General of the Order at the General Chapter in Lyon on 19 September 1891 and served in that post until 21 May 1904.

Frühwirth then served as a consultor of the Supreme Sacred Congregation of the Holy Office from 19 December 1906. He was named papal nuncio to the Kingdom of Bavaria by Pope Pius X on 26 October 1907.

Episcopate
Frühwirth was appointed titular archbishop of Heraclea in Europa by Pope Pius on 5 November 1907. He was consecrated on 30 November at the German national church of Santa Maria dell'Anima in Rome, by Rafael Merry del Val, Cardinal Secretary of State, assisted by Diomede Panici, titular archbishop of Laodicea, secretary of the Congregation of Rites, and by Giuseppe Cecchini, titular bishop of Alicarnaso, Archpriest of Altamura and Acquaviva delle Fonti.

Cardinalate
Frühwirth was created a Cardinal Priest by Pope Benedict XV in the consistory of 6 December 1915, with his titular church the Basilica of Santi Cosma e Damiano, at which time the title was raised from a deaconry to a presbytery. He remained working at nunciature until November 1916.

Frühwirth later participated in the conclave of 1922 that elected Pope Pius XI who appointed him Major Penitentiary on 8 January 1925, with his holding the post until 9 December 1927. Upon his appointment as Chancellor of the Holy Roman Church, he took the title of San Lorenzo in Damaso.

Frühwirth died in 1933 at the age of 87.

Notes

               

              
                        

              
                         

1845 births
1933 deaths
People from Feldbach District
Pontifical University of Saint Thomas Aquinas alumni
Masters of the Order of Preachers
20th-century Austrian cardinals
Dominican cardinals
Roman Catholic titular archbishops
Major Penitentiaries of the Apostolic Penitentiary
Apostolic Nuncios to Bavaria